Diana Janošťáková (born 29 September 1984) is a former competitive figure skater. She represented Slovakia in ladies' singles through 2002. In 2003, she began competing with Jiří Procházka in ice dancing for the Czech Republic. They became the 2005 Czech national champions.

Programs

Ice dance with Procházka

Single skating

Competitive highlights 
GP: Grand Prix; JGP: Junior Grand Prix

Ice dance with Procházka for the Czech Republic

Ladies' singles for Slovakia

References

External links 
 

Czech female ice dancers
Slovak female single skaters
1984 births
Living people
Figure skaters from Bratislava
Competitors at the 2005 Winter Universiade